Fitri Sham (born 26 February 1994) is a Malaysian cricketer who plays for the Malaysia national cricket team. He made his Twenty20 International (T20I) debut for Malaysia against Thailand on 24 June 2019 in the 2019 Malaysia Tri-Nation Series. In July 2019, he was named in Malaysia's squad for the Regional Finals of the 2018–19 ICC T20 World Cup Asia Qualifier tournament. He played in Malaysia's opening fixture of the Regional Finals, against Kuwait, on 22 July 2019.

References

External links
 

1994 births
Living people
Malaysian cricketers
Malaysia Twenty20 International cricketers
Place of birth missing (living people)
Southeast Asian Games silver medalists for Malaysia
Southeast Asian Games medalists in cricket
Competitors at the 2017 Southeast Asian Games